Wetheringsett is a village in the Mid Suffolk district of Suffolk in eastern England. Located to the east of the A140, it is the largest village in the parish of Wetheringsett-cum-Brockford.
	
Richard Hakluyt, writer best known for promoting the English colonisation of North America through his works, was rector of All Saints from 1590 to 1616.

External links

Villages in Suffolk